The Herald-Press may refer to:

The Herald-Press of Harvey, North Dakota
A former Michigan newspaper that merged with The Herald-Palladium of St. Joseph, Michigan

See also
 Herald (newspaper)#Herald Press, for newspapers with similar names